Cedar Pocket is a rural locality in the Gympie Region, Queensland, Australia. In the  Cedar Pocket had a population of 339 people.

History 
Cedar Pocket Provisional School opened in July 1906. On 1 January 1909 it became Cedar Pocket State School. It closed in 1965. It was located at the intersection of Cedar Pocket Road and East Deep Creek Road (approx ).

In the  Cedar Pocket had a population of 339 people.

Heritage listing 
Cedar Pocket School of Arts at Cedar Pocket Road is listed on the Gympie Local Heritage Register.

Community groups 
The Cedar Pocket branch of the Queensland Country Women's Association meets at the Cedar Pocket Hall at 483 Cedar Pocket Road.

References 

Gympie Region
Localities in Queensland